Toad River Hot Springs Provincial Park is a provincial park in British Columbia, Canada.  The hotsprings is located on the lefthand bank of the Toad River, outside of the Racing River outflow.  Access is via hiking, river boat, horseback, or helicopter.  There is no actual bathing pool, so visitors are not recommended to attempt bathing as heavy mud is a strong presence in the area. Access to this area is very difficult and crossing private property may be involved unless access is by boat or air. Land access is most easily accomplished by horse or hiking from the Stone Mountain Safaris parking lot, It is advisable that the lodge owners are contacted beforehand. They are very friendly and will always give advice as to how to get to the hot springs.

The park is part of the larger Muskwa-Kechika Management Area.

References

Northern Rockies Regional Municipality
Provincial parks of British Columbia
Peace River Country
Hot springs of British Columbia
Protected areas established in 1999
1999 establishments in British Columbia